Zadrna is a river in Lower Silesian Voivodeship in southwestern Poland, a right tributary of the Bóbr. It rises in the Góry Krucze range of the Central Sudetes near the village of Błażejów, close to the border with the Czech Republic.

Rivers of Poland
Rivers of Lower Silesian Voivodeship